Carl O. Sherman Sr. (born June 13, 1966) is an American politician. He is a Democrat who represents District 109 in the Texas House of Representatives.

Political career 

Sherman was elected mayor of DeSoto, Texas in May 2010, after having served as mayor pro tem in 2008 and 2009. He was re-elected in 2013.

Sherman became the City Manager of Ferris, Texas in July 2015. He resigned from that position in August 2016, and became the chief administrative officer of Hutchins, Texas in September of that year.

In 2018, Sherman ran for election to represent District 109 in the Texas House of Representatives, to replace former representative Helen Giddings, who had decided to retire. In a four-way Democratic primary, he advanced to a runoff against Deshaundra Lockhart Jones, which he won. He was the only candidate on the ballot in the general election. Sherman is running for re-election in 2020.

As of June 2020, Sherman sits on the following committees:
 Appropriations
 Appropriations Subcommittee on Article III
 Corrections
 House Administration

Electoral record

References 

1966 births
Living people
People from DeSoto, Texas
Northwood University alumni
African-American mayors in Texas
African-American state legislators in Texas
21st-century American politicians
Democratic Party members of the Texas House of Representatives
21st-century African-American politicians
20th-century African-American people